The 1947 Tulane Green Wave football team represented Tulane University as a member of the Southeastern Conference (SEC) during the 1947 college football season. Led by second-year head coach Henry Frnka, the Green Wave played their home games at Tulane Stadium in New Orleans. Tulane finished the season with an overall record of 2–5–2 and a mark of 2–3–2 in conference play, placing seventh in the SEC.

Schedule

References

Tulane
Tulane Green Wave football seasons
Tulane Green Wave football